In enzymology, a carbon-monoxide dehydrogenase (cytochrome b-561) is an enzyme that catalyzes the chemical reaction

CO + H2O + 2 ferricytochrome b-561  CO2 + 2 H+ + 2 ferrocytochrome b-561

The 3 substrates of this enzyme are CO, H2O, and ferricytochrome b-561, whereas its 3 products are CO2, H+, and ferrocytochrome b-561.

This enzyme belongs to the family of oxidoreductases, specifically those acting on the aldehyde or oxo group of donor with a cytochrome as acceptor.  The systematic name of this enzyme class is carbon monoxide,water:cytochrome b-561 oxidoreductase. Other names in common use include carbon monoxide oxidase, carbon monoxide oxygenase (cytochrome b-561), carbon monoxide:methylene blue oxidoreductase, CO dehydrogenase, and carbon-monoxide dehydrogenase.

References

 
 
 
 
 

EC 1.2.2
Enzymes of unknown structure
Carbon monoxide